The 1994–95 Sheffield Shield season was the 93rd season of the Sheffield Shield, the domestic first-class cricket competition of Australia.

Queensland, after 63 years of competition, won the Shield for the first time after having previously finished runners-up on 11 occasions.

Table

Final

References

Sheffield Shield
Sheffield Shield
Sheffield Shield seasons